The Nigerian Fencing Federation is the governing body that regulates and oversee the Olympic sport of fencing in Nigeria. Affiliated to the Nigeria Olympic Committee, the body is responsible for organizing fencing competitions locally and selecting fencers for international competitions.

References

External links

National members of the African Fencing Federation
Fencing
Fencing in Nigeria
Fencing organizations